Bohdana Olehivna Matsotska (also spelled Bogdana, born August 27, 1989) is an alpine skier from Ukraine. She competed for Ukraine at the 2010 Winter Olympics and was to compete for Ukraine at the 2014 Winter Olympics. Her best result was a 37th place in the slalom, achieved in 2010.

On 19 February 2014 Matsotska refused further participating in the 2014 Winter Olympics in protest against the violent clashes in Ukrainian's capital Kiev the previous day. She and her father posted a message on Facebook stating "In solidarity with the fighters on the barricades of the Maidan, and as a protest against the criminal actions made towards the protesters, the irresponsibility of the president and his lackey government, we refuse further performance at the Olympic Games in Sochi 2014".

Performances

References

External links
 
 

1989 births
Living people
Ukrainian female alpine skiers
Olympic alpine skiers of Ukraine
Alpine skiers at the 2010 Winter Olympics
Alpine skiers at the 2014 Winter Olympics
Sportspeople from Ivano-Frankivsk Oblast
21st-century Ukrainian women